Pedro Gastón Álvarez Sosa (born 24 March 2000) is a Uruguayan professional footballer who plays as a defender for La Liga club Getafe, on loan from Boston River.

Club career
Álvarez made his professional debut on 31 March 2019, playing the whole 90 minutes in a 4–2 league defeat against Racing Montevideo. He scored his first professional goal on 11 May 2019, netting the equalizer in a 1–1 draw against River Plate Montevideo.

Álvarez joined Boston River in April 2021 following Defensor's relegation to Segunda División. On 28 January of the following year, he moved abroad and joined Spanish La Liga side Getafe CF on loan until June 2023.

International career
Álvarez is a former Uruguay youth international. In June 2019, he was named in Uruguay's 18-man squad for the 2019 Pan American Games.

On 21 October 2022, Álvarez was named in Uruguay's 55-man preliminary squad for the 2022 FIFA World Cup.

Career statistics

Honours
Uruguay U20
 South American Games silver medal: 2018

References

External links
 

2000 births
Living people
People from Melo, Uruguay
Association football defenders
Uruguayan footballers
Uruguay youth international footballers
Uruguayan Primera División players
La Liga players
Defensor Sporting players
Boston River players
Getafe CF footballers
South American Games silver medalists for Uruguay
South American Games medalists in football
Uruguayan expatriate footballers
Uruguayan expatriate sportspeople in Spain
Expatriate footballers in Spain